In molecular biology, glycoside hydrolase family 31 is a family of glycoside hydrolases.

Glycoside hydrolases  are a widespread group of enzymes that hydrolyse the glycosidic bond between two or more carbohydrates, or between a carbohydrate and a non-carbohydrate moiety. A classification system for glycoside hydrolases, based on sequence similarity, has led to the definition of >100 different families. This classification is available on the CAZy web site, and also discussed at CAZypedia, an online encyclopedia of carbohydrate active enzymes.

Glycoside hydrolase family 31 CAZY GH_31 comprises enzymes with several known activities; alpha-glucosidase, alpha-galactosidase; glucoamylase, sucrase-isomaltase; alpha-xylosidase; alpha-glucan lyase.

Glycoside hydrolase family 31 groups a number of glycosyl hydrolases on the basis of sequence similarities An aspartic acid has been implicated in the catalytic activity of sucrase, isomaltase, and lysosomal alpha-glucosidase.

External links 
 GH31 in CAZypedia

References 

EC 3.2.1
Protein families
GH family